The Prva A liga, for sponsorships reasons named the Erste Liga, is the top-tier professional basketball league in Montenegro. It is the highest basketball division organized by the Basketball Association of Montenegro (KSCG). It was established in 2006. shortly after Montenegro declared its independence from Serbia and Montenegro.

The league is sponsored by and named after Erste Bank. Currently, two clubs from the area are playing in the regional ABA League. The most successful club in the Prva A liga is Budućnost Podgorica, which has won 14 titles, after winning the 2022 championship.

History

Before independence
During their history, many Montenegrin basketball clubs played in the top-tier basketball leagues of SFR Yugoslavia, FR Yugoslavia, and Serbia and Montenegro, including Budućnost, Lovćen, Sutjeska, Mornar, KK Primorka, KK Berane, Jedinstvo, and KK Temko Nikšić.

1946–1991: SFR Yugoslavia
From 1946 to 1991, two clubs from Montenegro, Berane (formerly KK Ivangrad) and Budućnost, played in the First Federal Basketball League. Others played in the Second Yugoslav League (during the 80's - First B League) and the Republic League.

Budućnost played in the First League during the nine seasons, with third place on the 1985–86 season as their biggest success at that time.

Below is the list of all-time participants of Montenegrin clubs in the First Yugoslav League.

1992–2006: Serbia and Montenegro
After the breakup of SFR Yugoslavia, until the Montenegrin independence in 2006, eight different Montenegrin teams participated in the First League of FR Yugoslavia / Serbia and Montenegro (YUBA League). Budućnost is the only team which played every single season in that competition, winning the three champion titles. Except them, Lovćen, Mornar, Sutjeska and Primorka are the only teams which participated in more than one season at the highest rank.

During that period, Budućnost became a founder of ABA League, too, where they play an important role until today. At the same time, Budućnost played its first seasons in Euroleague with the quarterfinals as their biggest success in the history of competition.

Below is the list of all-time participants of Montenegrin clubs in the YUBA League.

As the most successful Montenegrin basketball team, Budućnost won three national titles in the First League of Yugoslavia.

After independence
Soon after the Montenegrin independence referendum, Basketball Federation of Montenegro founded its own competitions, with the First League as a top-tier competition. During the all history, KK Budućnost was strongly dominant side.
Every season have two parts. During the first part, 8 to 10 clubs are playing league, without teams who are playing in ABA League. Until the season 2019-2020, in the second part, four best-placed teams from the league and two Montenegrin clubs from ABA League were competing in Superliga and four best-placed sides from that phase were participating in playoffs. Final series of playoffs is lasting until three wins of one opponent.
From season 2006-07 to 2016-17, every single champions' title won KK Budućnost. From 2006 to 2012, team from Podgorica created an impressive row of 89 wins with only one defeat in domestic championship. Except that, until 2015, team from Podgorica won every playoff final series with 3-0.
On season 2015-16, during the regular phase of the championship, game between KK Ulcinj and KK Jedinstvo finished with result 127-23. That was the biggest victory in the history of Montenegrin Championship. Except that, KK Ulcinj's player Miloš Popović on the same game scored 59 points, which is another all-time record of Montenegrin League.
An unexpected change came on season 2017-18, when KK Mornar won their first ever national title. In the finals, they surprisingly won the series against ABA League title holder - KK Budućnost (3-1).
Budućnost made a comeback on season 2018-19, defeating Mornar in the finals. During 2019, Montenegrin basketball federation implemented a new system of competition. Instead Superliga as the second phase, two best teams from the first part of season and two Montenegrin representatives in ABA League are directly qualifying for the playoff series.
Season 2019-20 was interrupted after 20 weeks, due to the coronavirus pandemic and Montenegrin basketball federation decided to erase every single result from that edition of competition.

Champions 
Since the establishing of competition, only two teams won the titles of Montenegrin champion. In 2018, Mornar was the second team to win the league after a streak of 11 consecutive trophies achieved by Budućnost.

Titles by season 
Below is the list of final series of Montenegrin Basketball League playoffs.

Titles by Club

Montenegrin League 
Below is a list of clubs with titles won in Montenegrin Basketball League.

Overall 
Below is an overall list, with titles won in both leagues - Montenegrin Basketball League and FR Yugoslavia / Serbia and Montenegro Championship.

Performances by clubs

Final placements
Since establishing, in Montenegrin basketball league participated 21 different teams. Club which played every single season until now are KK Budućnost, KK Jedinstvo, KK Lovćen, KK Mornar and KK Ulcinj.

All-time table
All-time Montenegrin First League table is a ranking of all Montenegrin basketball clubs based on their performance in national top tier. Highlighted clubs played in the First League in the 2021/22 season.

Including current season (2021/22)
Playout games against teams from Prva B Liga are not counted

Attendances by season

M = Number of matches (only matches with spectators counted); H = Highest attendance on one match; CH = Club with highest average attendance; CL = Club with lowest average attendance

Current season

Competition format
Eleven of the fourteen teams that play the league join the regular season. After that phase, two best teams from the regular season are qualifying for the playoffs, where they play against the two 2020–21 ABA League teams (Budućnost Voli and Mornar).Except that, two best teams from regular season are qualifying for the next season of ABA 2 League. The last qualified team is relegated to Prva B Liga.

Teams

Montenegrin basketball clubs in ABA League
Clubs from Montenegrin League are permanent participants of ABA League, one of strongest team competitions in Europe. In 2001, one of founders was Montenegrin side Budućnost Podgorica, which is among most successful members of competition. Except Budućnost, in ABA League played three other clubs from Montenegro - Lovćen, Sutjeska and Mornar.
KK Budućnost won ABA champions’ title on season 2017-18, which is the most significant success of Montenegrin clubs in that competition until now. 
Except that, Budućnost was a finalist on season 2018-19 and played seven times in semifinals (five times lost the game or series), while Mornar played once in that phase of playoffs.
Below is list of participation of Montenegrin clubs by every season of ABA League.

European competitions

Clubs from Montenegro have been playing in European basketball competitions since the 1980s. Until 2006, they represented SFR Yugoslavia and FR Yugoslavia. Almost all European seasons by Montenegrin clubs are played by KK Budućnost. Exceptions are three seasons played by KK Mornar Bar and one European performance by KK Lovćen Cetinje.

The most successful period was the end of the 1990s and the beginning of new century. At that time, KK Budućnost played in the finish phases of EuroLeague. In that period, Budućnost often played games against greatest European basketball teams like FC Barcelona, Real Madrid, CSKA Moscow, Panathinaikos, Olympiacos, Maccabi Tel Aviv.

Budućnost made their comeback to Euroleague on season 2018-19, with few impressive results as wins against CSKA Moscow, Real Madrid and FC Barcelona.

During the overall history, three different Montenegrin clubs played in FIBA/ULEB competitions. KK Budućnost played in numerous competitions (Euroleague, Eurocup/ULEB Cup, Saporta Cup/FIBA EuroCup, FIBA Korać Cup). KK Mornar played in ULEB EuroCup, Basketball Champions League and FIBA Europe Cup, while KK Lovćen played one season in FIBA Korać Cup.

Records
As of the end of FIBA/ULEB competitions 2019–20 season.

See also
 ABA League
 Second Basketball League
 Montenegrin Basketball Cup
 Montenegrin Women's Basketball League

References

External links
Official Website
Montenegrin league on Eurobasket

 
Sports leagues established in 2006
Basketball leagues in Montenegro